"Why Lady Why" is a song co-written and recorded by American country music artist Gary Morris.  It was released in November 1983 as the fourth single and title track from the album Why Lady Why.  The song reached #4 on the Billboard Hot Country Singles & Tracks chart.  Morris wrote the song with Eddie Setser.

Chart performance

References

1984 singles
Gary Morris songs
Song recordings produced by Bob Montgomery (songwriter)
Warner Records singles
Songs written by Eddie Setser
1983 songs
Songs written by Gary Morris